WFOR-TV (channel 4) is a television station in Miami, Florida, United States, serving as the market's CBS outlet. It is owned and operated by the network's CBS News and Stations division alongside independent station WBFS-TV (channel 33). Both stations share studios on Northwest 18th Terrace in Doral, while WFOR-TV's transmitter is located in Andover, Florida.

History

WCIX, channel 6
The station first signed on the air on September 20, 1967, as WCIX-TV, broadcasting on VHF channel 6. The station was originally owned by the locally-based Coral Television Corporation. General Cinema Corporation acquired a controlling interest in Coral Television and WCIX in August 1972.

The channel 6 frequency was allocated to Miami by the Federal Communications Commission (FCC) in June 1957, as part of a minor reorganization nationwide of VHF channel assignments. The channel was reallocated to the city of South Miami when Coral Television was awarded a construction permit to build channel 6 in April 1964. In February 1967, seven months before WCIX went on the air, Coral Television successfully convinced the FCC to move the community of license back to Miami proper, where the station could serve more viewers.

This arrangement was necessary to protect WPTV (on adjacent channel 5) in West Palm Beach and WDBO-TV (now WKMG-TV, and also on channel 6) in Orlando. As a result, Miami's channel 6 only provided a "Grade B" signal to Fort Lauderdale and was virtually unviewable in the northern portion of Broward County. The station made up for this shortfall in its coverage area by signing on translator stations throughout Broward County and in Boca Raton (part of the West Palm Beach market) in 1972. Initially broadcasting on channel 61 from the First National Bank building in Fort Lauderdale, channel 64 from atop the Boca Raton Hotel, and channel 69 from the Home Federal building in Hollywood, WCIX later added a 1,000-watt translator on channel 33 transmitting from Hallandale. The channel 33 translator was shut down in early 1984 to allow future sister station WBFS-TV to sign on; as a result, WCIX lost significant circulation in Palm Beach County. Channel 69 was relinquished when the full-power allotment it used was activated as WYHS-TV in 1988; the license remained active, however.

WCIX-TV was the first general entertainment independent station in the Miami–Fort Lauderdale market, and the second in Florida, after WSUN-TV (whose channel 38 allocation is now occupied by WTTA) in St. Petersburg converted to an independent in 1965. Channel 6 ran the typical independent format of children's programs, sitcoms, movies, and other local and syndicated programs. WCIX was also one of the very few stations not owned by Kaiser Broadcasting to carry The Lou Gordon Program from WKBD-TV in Detroit in the 1970s. It was also one of the first stations in the area to offer programming in both English and Spanish to serve South Florida's growing Hispanic population. From the 1970s to the early 1980s, WCIX had widespread cable penetration throughout Florida and was seen on cable systems as far north as Tampa Bay and Orlando. Outside the Miami market, WCIX shared its cable channel space with another Miami station, WKID-TV (channel 51, now WSCV), which presented older movies and sitcoms after WCIX left the air.

The station was the only general entertainment independent in the market until 1976, when WHFT-TV (channel 45) was purchased by LeSEA Broadcasting and switched a hybrid schedule of general entertainment and religious programs. In 1980, WHFT was sold to the Trinity Broadcasting Network and switched to religious programming full-time, leaving WCIX as the market's lone independent once again. However, it would receive competition once again in 1982 when WDZL (channel 39, now WSFL-TV) signed on.

General Cinema traded WCIX-TV to Cincinnati-based Taft Broadcasting in early 1983 in exchange for WGR-TV (now WGRZ) in Buffalo, New York and $70 million. Under Taft, WCIX (the station officially dropped the "-TV" suffix from its call sign in 1984) continued to be the leading independent station in South Florida; the station moved from its original studios on Brickell Avenue in downtown Miami to its current facility in Doral (then an unincorporated area, now a separate city) in 1985.

On October 9, 1986, WCIX became a charter affiliate of the newly launched Fox Broadcasting Company, and was one of a handful of VHF stations to affiliate with the network upon its launch. The station was essentially still independent since Fox offered only an hour of late-night programming at the time (consisting only of the talk show The Late Show Starring Joan Rivers) and would only add two nights of prime time programming by the end of the station's tenure with the network.

Acquisition by CBS
After losing a bid to purchase then-CBS affiliate WTVJ (then on channel 4) from then-owner Kohlberg Kravis Roberts & Co., CBS made a half-hearted offer to buy WCIX from Taft in January 1987. Taft declined, but a month later opted to sell all of its independent stations and Fox affiliates, including WCIX, to the TVX Broadcast Group. However, TVX became mired in debt as a result of the purchase, and began to sell off many of its medium- and small-market stations. Although TVX originally planned to keep WCIX, the company eventually decided that the station would have to be divested. One of the primary factors in the decision to sell was that WCIX was TVX's only VHF station, whereas its sister stations were all broadcasting on the UHF band. KKR sold WTVJ to NBC in September 1987. However, CBS' affiliation contract with WTVJ did not expire until December 31, 1988, as did NBC's contract with WSVN (channel 7), which had served as its Miami affiliate since that station signed on in July 1956. WSVN's owner, Sunbeam Television, was not willing to end channel 7's affiliation with NBC one year early. NBC was thus forced to run WTVJ as a CBS affiliate for over a year—a situation that did not sit well with either NBC or CBS.

With the defection of WTVJ looming, CBS made another offer to TVX to acquire WCIX in the spring of 1988. The two sides agreed to a final deal in August of that year. In the interim, channel 6 agreed to air CBS programs that WTVJ chose to preempt. Meanwhile, WSVN fought to retain its relationship with NBC, but later relented and approached CBS for an affiliation deal. CBS turned the offer down and went forward with its plans to purchase WCIX despite its weak signal in Broward County.

The affiliation changeover officially occurred on January 1, 1989: the entire CBS network schedule moved to WCIX, while NBC's full schedule of programs moved to WTVJ. Fox moved its programming over to WSVN (although the station advertised itself as an independent upon the switch); most of WCIX's syndicated programming inventory went to WDZL. CBS formally finalized its purchase of WCIX the next day. In the case of Miami–Fort Lauderdale, it is one of two television markets in which the Fox affiliation moved from one VHF station to another (the other being Honolulu, Hawaii if stations not operating as satellites are counted, when Fox affiliate KHNL and NBC affiliate KHON-TV swapped affiliations on January 1, 1996) – and the only known instance of a longtime "Big Three" affiliate switching to Fox prior to Fox's 1994 affiliation agreement with New World Communications and other affiliation transactions involving the network that resulted from the deal.

Despite a significant technical overhaul and upgraded programming, WCIX struggled as a CBS station due to its weak signal in Fort Lauderdale. CBS anticipated this issue and, in conjunction with the purchase of WCIX, persuaded West Palm Beach's longtime ABC affiliate WPEC (channel 12) to switch to CBS. WPEC replaced UHF station WTVX (channel 34, now a CW affiliate) in order to give the network a stronger signal in northern Broward County. In 1989, translator W27AQ was launched on channel 27 from a transmitter in Pompano Beach. A transmitter at Coral Springs, W55BO, was launched in 1993. The former channel 69 transmitter license was reactivated on channel 58 as W58BU in 1994.

WCIX's transmission tower collapsed on August 24, 1992, as a result of destructive winds caused by Hurricane Andrew, forcing channel 6 off the air. Within hours, the station resumed broadcasts via the channel 27 translator at Pompano Beach. WDZL began carrying WCIX's newscasts the next day. Within several days, WCIX was back on the air using an emergency transmitter on a borrowed tower near the Dade–Broward line; as a result of being further north, the facility had to operate at reduced power. In the wake of the devastation, WCIX's staff helped create Neighbors Helping Neighbors, a grassroots charitable organization which aimed to help people rebuild. The organization lives on as Neighbors 4 Neighbors, which is still supported by the station.

Move to channel 4

On July 14, 1994, Westinghouse Broadcasting (Group W) signed a long-term affiliation deal with CBS, part of which resulted in three Westinghouse-owned stations (WBZ-TV in Boston, WJZ-TV in Baltimore and KYW-TV in Philadelphia) becoming CBS affiliates. As a sidebar, a subsequent deal between NBC and a new joint venture between Group W and CBS was reached in November 1994, with CBS selling the channel 6 transmitter facility and license to NBC as compensation for the loss of Westinghouse-owned NBC affiliates KYW-TV and WBZ-TV. In return, Group W/CBS received the stronger channel 4 transmitter facility, license, and cash as compensation for the loss of Philadelphia's WCAU-TV, which was being acquired by NBC. NBC also included two of its owned-and-operated stations, KCNC-TV in Denver and KUTV in Salt Lake City (which was acquired earlier that year), in the trade agreement with Group W/CBS.

At 1:00 a.m. on September 10, 1995, WCIX and WTVJ swapped channel positions. The entire WCIX intellectual unit (CBS affiliation, programming, and staff) moved from channel 6 to channel 4, returning CBS programming to channel 4 after a six-year hiatus. WTVJ had been Miami's CBS affiliate from its sign-on in March 1949 until the 1989 switch to NBC. Along with the frequency change came a new set of call letters, WFOR-TV, changing the reference to the station's channel number from its original allocation to its new one. Due to the way the asset exchange deal was structured, the two stations were required to swap licenses in addition to the transmitting facilities. As a result, WFOR-TV legally operated under WTVJ's old license on channel 4 through the end of the analog broadcasting era; however, the studios of both WFOR-TV and WTVJ remained the same at the time of the swap (WTVJ has since moved to a new facility). The translators remained with the channel 6 facility.

Under the terms of the deal, CBS sold controlling interest (55%) in WFOR-TV to Westinghouse, while retaining a minority interest (45%). WFOR became wholly owned by CBS once again when the Westinghouse Electric Corporation merged with CBS at the end of 1995.

In 1999, the station was given the National Association of Broadcasters Service to America Television Award.

In 2000, Viacom bought CBS, making WFOR a sister station to UPN affiliate WBFS-TV, which subsequently moved into WFOR's studio facility (Viacom was also the owner of some of WFOR's sister stations under TVX by this time). The station also handled some support operations for WTVX in West Palm Beach until it was sold to the Cerberus Capital Management subsidiary Four Points Media Group in 2007. WFOR-TV and WBFS-TV became properties of CBS Corporation, when Viacom split up its assets in December 2005; the split would be reversed 14 years later, as the conglomerates would remerge, making both stations part of ViacomCBS. On February 16, 2022, ViacomCBS changed its name to Paramount Global.

Programming

Sports programming
Since 1998, through CBS' broadcast contract with the AFC, WFOR has been the primary station for the Miami Dolphins; starting in 2014, with the NFL's new "cross-flex" broadcast rules, more games can be broadcast on WFOR. The station also provided local coverage of Super Bowls XLI and XLIV, both of which were hosted at what is now Hard Rock Stadium.

Since 2020, WFOR shares the over-the-air broadcast rights to Major League Soccer's Inter Miami CF with sister station WBFS-TV.

News operation
On January 11, 2010, WFOR-TV began broadcasting its newscasts from a temporary set in preparation for production upgrades to broadcast its news programming in high definition. After about two weeks of preparation, on January 24, 2010, WFOR-TV became the last major English-language station in the Miami television market and the last CBS-owned station with a full-time news department to begin broadcasting its local newscasts in high definition (Detroit sister station WWJ-TV was technically the last CBS-owned station with an in-house news operation that continued to broadcast in standard definition, but it upgraded its news production to high definition on February 2, 2012; however, it does not produce or air regular evening or late-night newscasts nor does it have a full-scale news department, and had only carried a morning news program at the time of the upgrade). The newscasts on sister station WBFS-TV were also included in the upgrade at that time (WFOR would discontinue producing newscasts for that station in September 2011). The upgrade included a major retooling of the station's news set, the purchase of new studio equipment, changes to master control operations, and the implementation of new graphics. Along with the revamp, a new logo was introduced, which would further emphasize a "South Florida feel".

On December 4, 2017, WFOR expanded CBS 4 News This Morning from 5–7 a.m. to 4:30–7 a.m.

WFOR-TV launched a streaming news service, CBS News Miami (a localized version of the national CBS News streaming service) on January 24, 2022, as part of a rollout of similar services across the CBS-owned stations. The service was originally announced as CBSN Miami, but its launch coincided with the rebranding of the CBSN services under the CBS News name.

Notable current on-air staff
 Eliott Rodriguez – anchor
 Jim Berry – sports director; previously sports director until shift to morning anchor in June 2008, but returned to sports in late 2009

Notable former on-air staff

 Gayle Anderson (now at KTLA in Los Angeles)
 Susan Barnett (last at KYW-TV in Philadelphia)
 Lisa Cabrera (moved to WNYW in New York City, has since left the station)
 Giselle Fernández – anchor
 Rick Folbaum – anchor (now at WANF in Atlanta)
 John Hambrick (1990–1993; deceased)
 Robb Hanrahan – anchor/reporter (last with WHP-TV in Harrisburg, deceased)
 Dave Malkoff (now at The Weather Channel)
 Antonio Mora – 5:00, 6:00 and 11:00 p.m. co-anchor (2008–2011); 6:00 p.m. solo anchor (2011–2012; was at Al Jazeera America)
 Bryan Norcross – "Hurricane Specialist", executive producer storm coverage and CBS News hurricane consultant (now at Fox Weather)
 Jeff Pegues – reporter/anchor (2002–2005; now with CBS News)
 Katie Phang – commentator (now at MSNBC)
 Ralph Renick – anchor/commentator (1988–1990; formerly at WTVJ from 1949 to 1985; died in 1991)
 John Roberts (formerly J.D. Roberts) – anchor/reporter (now at Fox News Channel)
 Maggie Rodriguez – 5, 6, and 11 p.m. anchor (later co-host of The Early Show on CBS; now with WFLA-TV in Tampa)
 Ken Rosato – anchor (2000–2002; now at WABC-TV in New York City)
 Jennifer Santiago (now DirecTV correspondent for Hometown Heroes)

Technical information

Subchannels
The station's digital signal is multiplexed:

Analog-to-digital conversion
WFOR-TV signed on its digital signal on May 1, 2001. The station ended programming on its analog signal, on VHF channel 4, at 12:30 p.m. on June 12, 2009, the official date in which full-power television stations in the United States transitioned from analog to digital broadcasts under federal mandate. The station's digital signal continued to broadcast on its pre-transition UHF channel 22. Through the use of PSIP, digital television receivers display the station's virtual channel as its former VHF analog channel 4.

Former translators
WFOR-TV previously operated two translator stations located in the Florida Keys: W38AA (analog channel 38) in Marathon and W39AC (analog channel 39) in Key West. Mapale LLC, which has owned them since at least 1979, now operates them as translators of Key West-based Spanish language station WSBS-TV (channel 22), making its entire service area redundant. Their "digital companion channels" are licensed separately from their analog allocations, and have Mapale's own WGEN-TV (channel 8, also from Key West) listed as their primary station.

Out of market coverage 
WFOR-TV is carried by Bahamas-based cable system REV TV.

References

External links

 

FOR-TV
CBS News and Stations
CBS network affiliates
Start TV affiliates
Dabl affiliates
Television channels and stations established in 1967
1967 establishments in Florida
Taft Broadcasting
National Football League primary television stations